This is a complete List of National Historic Landmarks in California. The United States National Historic Landmark (NHL) program is operated under the auspices of the National Park Service, and recognizes structures, districts, objects, and similar resources nationwide according to a list of criteria of national significance. The listings in the state of California express the diversity of California's heritage, including pre-Columbian peoples, the Spanish and Mexican periods, maritime activity, space exploration, and many other themes.

The table below lists all 146 sites, along with added detail and description.  The sites are distributed across 36 of California's 58 counties.

Current NHLs 
One site, Yuma Crossing and Associated Sites, is shared with Arizona and is listed by the National Park Service in that state.  Lower Klamath National Wildlife Refuge is shared with Oregon but credited to California.

|}

Former NHLs 
In addition, there are four sites that were once National Historic Landmarks in California but are not currently.

See also 

 California Point of Historical Interest
 California Register of Historical Resources
 Historic preservation
 History of California
 List of California Historical Landmarks
 List of California State Historic Parks
 National Register of Historic Places listings in California
 National Register of Historic Places

References

Further reading

External links 
 National Historic Landmarks Program, at National Park Service
 National Park Service listings of National Historic Landmarks

 
National Historic Landmark
History of Sonoma County, California
California
National Historic Landmark
National Historic Landmark
Historic Landmark